Trivellona eglantina is a species of small sea snail, a marine gastropod mollusk in the family Triviidae, the false cowries or trivias.

Description
The length of the shell attains 9.1 mm.

Distribution
This marine species occurs off the Philippines.

References

 Dolin, L. (2001). Les Triviidae (Mollusca: Caenogastropoda) de l'Indo-Pacifique: Révision des genres Trivia, Dolichupis et Trivellona = Indo-Pacific Triviidae (Mollusca: Caenogastropoda): Revision of Trivia, Dolichupis and Trivellona. in: Bouchet, P. et al. (Ed.) Tropical deep-sea benthos. Mémoires du Muséum national d'Histoire naturelle. Série A, Zoologie. 185: 201-241
 Fehse D. & Grego J. (2004) Contribution to the knowledge of the Triviidae (Mollusca: Gastropoda). IX. Revision of the genus Trivellona. Berlin and Banska Bystrica. Pubished as a CD in 2004; as a book in 2009

Triviidae
Gastropods described in 2001